The following list is a discography of productions by Irv Gotti, an American record producer and music executive from New York City, New York. It includes a list of songs produced, co-produced and remixed by year, artist, album and title.

Singles produced

1994

Ca$h Money Click 

 "4 My Click"
"Get tha Fortune"

1995

Mic Geronimo - The Natural 

 06. "Time to Build" (featuring Ja Rule, Jay-Z and DMX)
 07. "Shit's Real"

1996

Jay-Z  - Reasonable Doubt 

 08. "Can I Live"
 15. "Can't Knock the Hustle" (Fool's Paradise remix with Meli'sa Morgan)

1997

Mic Geronimo - Vendetta 

 09. "Single Life" (featuring Jay-Z) (produced with Lil Rob)

1998

Various Artists - Streets Is Watching 

 03. "Only a Customer" (performed by Jay-Z)

DMX - It's Dark and Hell Is Hot 

 01. "Intro" (produced with Lil Rob)
 12. "Crime Story" (produced with Lil Rob)

Jay-Z - Vol. 2... Hard Knock Life 

 09. "Can I Get A..." (featuring Ja Rule and Amil) (produced with Lil Rob)

Various Artists - Belly soundtrack 

 03. "Grand Finale" (performed by DMX, Ja Rule, Method Man and Nas) (produced with Lil Rob)
 09. "Story to Tell" (performed by Ja Rule)

DMX - Flesh of My Flesh, Blood of My Blood 

 05. "We Don't Give a Fuck" (featuring Jadakiss and Styles P) (produced with Dat Nigga Reb)

1999

Foxy Brown - Chyna Doll 

 04. "Hot Spot" (produced with Lil Rob)
 14. "BWA" (featuring Mia X & Gangsta Boo) (produced with Lil Rob)

Ja Rule - Venni Vetti Vecci 

 01. "The March Prelude"
 02. "We Here Now" (featuring Black Child) (produced with Lil Rob)
 03. "World's Most Dangerous" (featuring Nemesis) (produced with Tyrone Fyffe and Lil Rob)
 04. "Let's Ride" (produced with Lil Rob)
 05. "Holla Holla" (produced with Tai)
 06. "Kill 'Em All" (featuring Jay-Z) (produced with Self)
 08. "Nigguz Theme" (produced with Lil Rob)
 09. "Suicide Freestyle" (featuring Case)
 10. "Story to Tell" (produced with Lil Rob)
 12. "Count on Yo Nigga" (produced with Lil Rob)
 13. "It's Murda" (featuring DMX and Jay-Z) (produced with Ty Fyffe)
 14. "E-Dub and Ja" (featuring Erick Sermon) (produced with Erick Sermon)
 16. "Murda 4 Life" (featuring Memphis Bleek) (produced with Tai)
 17. "Daddy's Little Baby" (featuring Ronald Isley) (produced with Self)
 18. "Race Against Time" (produced with Lil Rob)
 19. "Only Begotten Son" (produced with Tyrone Fyffe and Lil Rob)
 20. "The Murderers" (featuring Black Child and Tah Murdah) (produced with DL)

Memphis Bleek - Coming of Age 

 05. "Murda 4 Life" (featuring Ja Rule) (produced with Mr. Fingers)
 08. "You a Thug Nigga"
 12. "My Hood to Your Hood" (featuring Beanie Sigel) (produced with Mr. Fingers)

Ol' Dirty Bastard - Nigga Please 

 02. "I Can't Wait" (produced with Dat Nigga Reb)
 05. "Rollin' Wit You" (produced with Mr. Fingers)
 07. "You Don't Want to Fuck With Me" (produced with DL)

Various artists - Next Friday soundtrack 

 03. "We Murderers Baby" (performed by Vita and Ja Rule) (produced with Dat Nigga Reb)

DMX - ... And Then There Was X 

 10. "What's My Name?" (produced with Self Service)
 17. "Angel" (featuring Regina Belle)

Jay-Z - Vol. 3... Life and Times of S. Carter 

 10. "Watch Me" (featuring Dr. Dre) (produced with Lil Rob)

2000

Various artists- Romeo Must Die soundtrack 

 02. "Come Back in One Piece" (performed by Aaliyah and DMX) (produced with Lil Rob)
 12. "Somebody's Gonna Die Tonight" (performed by Dave Bing and Lil' Mo) (produced with Lil Rob)

Canibus - 2000 B.C. (Before Can-I-Bus) 

 10. "Lost @ "C"" (produced with Taiwan Green)

Ja Rule - Rule 3:36 

 01. "Intro" (produced with Lil Rob)
 02. "Watching Me" (produced with Lil Rob)
 03. "Between Me and You" (featuring Christina Milian) (produced with Lil Rob)
 04. "Put It on Me" (featuring Vita) (produced with Tru Stylze)
 05. "6 Feet Underground" (produced with Self Service)
 06. "Love Me, Hate Me" (produced with Lil Rob and Ja Rule)
 07. "Die" (featuring Tah Murdah, Black Child and Dave Bing) (produced with Ty Fyffe)
 08. "Fuck You" (featuring 01 and Vita) (produced with Dat Nigga Reb)
 09. "I'll Fuck U Girl (Skit)"
 10. "Grey Box (Skit)"
 11. "Extasy" (featuring Tah Murdah, Black Child and Jayo Felony) (produced with Lil Rob)
 12. "It's Your Life" (featuring Shade Sheist) (produced with Damizza)
 13. "I Cry" (featuring Lil' Mo) (produced with Lil Rob)
 14. "One of Us" (produced with Lil Rob)
 15. "Chris Black (Skit)"
 16. "The Rule Won't Die" (produced with Lil Rob)

2001

Various artists - Exit Wounds: The Album 

 02. "State to State" (performed by Black Child & Ja Rule) (produced with Mr. Fingerz)

Big Pun - Endangered Species 

 05. "How We Roll" (featuring Ashanti) (produced with Tru Stylez)

Ja Rule - Pain Is Love 

 02. "Dial M for Murder" (produced with Ty Fyffe)
 03. "Livin' It Up" (featuring Case) (produced with Lil Rob)
 04. "The Inc." (featuring Caddillac Tah, Black Child & Ashanti)
 05. "Always on Time" (featuring Ashanti)
 06. "Down Ass Bitch" (featuring Charli Baltimore)
 07. "Never Again"
 08. "Worldwide Gangsta" (featuring Caddillac Tah, Black Child, Boo & Gotti)
 10. "I'm Real (Murder Remix)" (featuring Jennifer Lopez)
 11. "Smokin' & Ridin'" (featuring Jodie Mack & O-1)
 12. "X" (featuring Missy Elliott & Tweet)
 14. "Lost Little Girl"
 15. "So Much Pain" (featuring 2Pac) (produced with Lil Rob)
 16. "Pain Is Love"

Fat Joe - Jealous Ones Still Envy (J.O.S.E.) 

 04. "Opposites Attract (What They Like)" (featuring Remy Ma) (produced with Self Service)
 09. "What's Luv?" (featuring Ja Rule & Ashanti) (produced with Chink Santana)

Ruff Ryders - Ryde or Die Vol. 3: In the "R" We Trust 

 04. "U, Me & She"

2002

Beenie Man - Tropical Storm 

 04. "Real Gangsta" (produced with Chink Santana)

Ashanti - Ashanti 

 01. "Intro" (produced with 7 Aurelius and Chink Santana)
 02. "Foolish" (produced with 7 Aurelius)
 03. "Happy" (produced with Chink Santana)
 04. "Leaving (Always on Time Part II)" (featuring Ja Rule) (produced with 7 Aurelius)
 06. "Call" (produced with 7 Aurelius)
 07. "Scared" (featuring Irv Gotti) (produced with Chink Santana)
 08. "Rescue" (produced with 7 Aurelius)
 09. "Baby" (produced with 7 Aurelius and Chink Santana)
 10. "VooDoo" (produced with 7 Aurelius)
 11. "Movies" (produced with 7 Aurelius, Reggie Wright, and Jared Thomas)
 13. "Over" (produced with Chink Santana)
 14. "Unfoolish" (featuring The Notorious B.I.G.) (produced with 7 Aurelius)
 16. "Dreams" (produced with 7 Aurelius)

N.O.R.E. - God's Favorite 

 08. "Live My Life" (featuring Ja Rule)

Eve - Eve-Olution 

 03. "Gangsta Lovin'" (featuring Alicia Keys) (produced with 7 Aurelius)
 04. "Irresistible Chick" (produced with 7 Aurelius)

Fat Joe - Loyalty 

 06. "Turn Me On" (featuring Ronda Blackwell) (produced with Chink Santana)

Ja Rule - The Last Temptation 

 02. "Thug Lovin'" (featuring Bobby Brown) (produced with Chink Santana)
 03. "Mesmerize" (featuring Ashanti) (produced with Chink Santana)
 05. "The Pledge (Remix)" (featuring Ashanti, Nas & 2Pac) (produced with 7 Aurelius)
 06. "Murder Reigns" (featuring Celeste Scalone) (produced with 7 Aurelius)
 07. "Last Temptation" (featuring Charli Baltimore) (produced with Chink Santana)
 08. "Murder Me" (featuring Caddillac Tah & Alexi) (produced with Chink Santana)
 09. "The Warning" (produced with Chink Santana)
 10. "Connected" (featuring Eastwood & Crooked I) (produced with Chink Santana)
 11. "Emerica" (featuring Young Life & Chink Santana) (produced with Chink Santana)
 12. "Rock Star" (produced with Chink Santana)

2003

Various artists - Dysfunktional Family soundtrack 

 08. "All My" (performed by Ashanti) (produced with China Black)

Ruben Studdard - Soulful 

 05. "What is Sexy" (featuring Fat Joe)

Ja Rule - Blood In My Eye 

 01. "Murder Intro"
 02. "The Life" (featuring Hussein Fatal, Cadillac Tah, James Gotti) (produced with Jimi Kendrix)
 03. "Clap Back" (produced with Scott Storch)
 04. "The Crown" (featuring Sizzla) (produced with Chink Santana)
 06. "Things Gon' Change" (featuring Black Child, Young Merc, D.O. Cannons) (produced with Jimi Kendrix)
 07. "Always Time" (produced with Jimi Kendrix)
 09. "N***** & B******"
 10. "The I.N.C. Is Back" (featuring Shadow, Sekou 720, Black Child)
 12. "Blood In My Eye" (featuring Hussein Fatal) (produced with Jimi Kendrix)
 13. "It's Murda Freestyle" (featuring Hussein Fatal)
 14. "The Wrap Freestyle" (featuring Hussein Fatal)

2004

Lloyd - Southside 

 01. "ATL Tales / Ride Wit Me" (featuring Ja Rule) (produced with Jimi Kendrix)
03. "Southside" (featuring Ashanti) (produced with Wirlie Morris)
04. "Feelin You" (produced with Chink Santana)
05. "Take It Low" (produced with Demi-Doc)
06. "Hustler" (featuring Chink Santana) (produced with Chink Santana)
07. "My Life" (produced with Demi-Doc)
10. "Feels So Right" (produced with Demi-Doc)
15. "Yesterday" (produced with Artie Green)

Shyne - Godfather Buried Alive 

 08. "Jimmy Choo" (featuring Ashanti)

Ja Rule - R.U.L.E. 

 02. "Last of The Mohicans" (featuring Black Child) (produced with Chink Santana)
 03. "Wonderful" (featuring R. Kelly & Ashanti) (produced with Jimi Kendrix)
 04. "What's My Name" (featuring Ashanti) (produced with Jimi Kendrix)
 05. "New York" (featuring Fat Joe & Jadakiss) (produced with Cool & Dre)
 07. "The Manual" (produced with Jimi Kendrix and Francion Corbett)
 08. "Get It Started" (featuring Claudette Ortiz) (produced with Jimi Kendrix)
 09. "R.U.L.E." (produced with Jimi Kendrix)
 11. "Caught Up" (featuring Lloyd) (produced with Jimi Kendrix and Boogz)
 12. "Gun Talk" (featuring Black Child) (produced with Chink Santana)
 13. "Never Thought" (produced with Jimi Kendrix)
 14. "Life Goes On" (featuring Trick Daddy & Chink Santana) (produced with Chink Santana)
 16. "Where I'm From" (featuring Lloyd) (produced with Chink Santana)
 17. "Bout My Business" (featuring Caddillac Tah, Black Child & Young Merc) (produced with DJ Twinz)
 18. "Passion" (produced with Jimi Kendrix and Boogz)

Ashanti - Concrete Rose 

 01. Concrete Rose" (Intro) (produced with 7 Aurelius)
 02. "Still Down" (featuring T.I.) (produced with Malcolm Flythe and Jimi Kendrix)
 03. "Message to the Fans" (Skit) (produced with 7 Aurelius)
 04. "Only U" (produced with 7 Aurelius)
 05. "Focus" (produced with 7 Aurelius)
 06. "Don't Let Them" (produced with Demi-Doc)
 07. "Love Again" (produced with 7 Aurelius)
 08. "Take Me Tonight" (featuring Lloyd) (produced with Jimi Kendrix)
 09. "U" (produced with 7 Aurelius)
 10. "Every Lil' Thing" (produced with 7 Aurelius)
 11. "Turn It Up" (featuring Ja Rule) (produced with Jimi Kendrix)
 13. " Hot" (produced with Demi-Doc and Chink Santana)

14. "Don't Leave Me Alone" (featuring 7 Aurelius) (produced with 7 Aurelius)
16. "Freedom" (produced with Demi-Doc)
17. "Wonderful" (Remix) (featuring Ja Rule & R. Kelly) (produced with Jimi Kendrix)

2012

Lil B - Glassface 

 02. "Mr. Glassface" (produced with Ty Fyffe)

2018

Kanye West - Ye 

 07. "Violent Crimes" (produced with 7 Aurelius and Kanye West)

References 

Discographies of American artists
Production discographies
Hip hop discographies